DNA polymerase delta subunit 3 is an enzyme that in humans is encoded by the POLD3 gene. It is a component of the  DNA polymerase delta complex.

Interactions 
POLD3 has been shown to interact with PCNA.

References

Further reading